1 Mile to You is a 2017 American sports romantic drama film directed by Leif Tilden and starring Billy Crudup, Graham Rogers, Liana Liberato, Stefanie Scott, Tim Roth, and Melanie Lynskey.  It is based on Jeremy Jackson's 2002 novel Life at These Speeds.

Plot
When a teenager loses his girlfriend in a horrible and devastating accident, he finds that his running keeps him connected to her during his "runner's high" moments in which his heart elates and becomes ecstatic. Chasing her memory drives him to run faster and win races for his new coach. Before long, his newfound notoriety attracts the attention of a whip-smart new girl who is determined to find out what's really going on inside him.

Cast
Tim Roth as Coach Jared
Peter Coyote as Principal Umber
Billy Crudup as Coach K
Melanie Lynskey as Coach Rowan
Graham Rogers as Kevin
Liana Liberato as Henny
Stefanie Scott as Ellie
Jaren Mitchell as Jol  Brule
Thomas Cocquerel as Rye Bledsoe
Peter Holden as Mr. Schuler

Production 
The movie was filmed in Jackson, Mississippi and other locations near it.

Reception
S. Jhoanna Robledo of Common Sense Media gave the film two stars out of five. It received a 65% rating on Rotten Tomatoes.

References

External links
 
 

2017 films
American romantic drama films
American sports drama films
Films based on American novels
2017 romantic drama films
2010s sports drama films
Films shot in Mississippi
2010s English-language films
2010s American films